The 2017–18 Liiga season was the 43rd season of the SM-liiga (branded simply as "Liiga"), the top level of ice hockey in Finland, since the league's formation in 1975. Tappara was the season as a defending champion. This season included a record number of matches played on Fridays and Saturdays. In autumn, there was a national team break from 5 November until 13 November.

The specialties of the season included, for the first time in Liiga history, double games between KooKoo and Vaasan Sport. Teams met twice in October in consecutive evenings in Kouvola and in February twice in succession in Vaasa. In December, HIFK and Kärpät met in the hockey outdoor show at Kaisaniemi, Helsinki.

In 2018, the Liiga continued on Wednesday, 3 January. Ice hockey at the 2018 Winter Olympics in South Korea's Pyeongchang start with the Finland men's national ice hockey team on February 14, 2018. In Liiga, a full round was played on Saturday 17 February, after which the Olympic Games started. Liiga games resumed on Tuesday, February 27.

Kärpät won the championship by winning Tappara in the final series 4-2.

Teams

Regular season
Top six advance straight to quarter-finals, while teams between 7th and 10th positions play wild card round for the final two spots. The Liiga is a closed series and thus there is no relegation.

Rules for classification: 1) Points; 2) 3-point wins 3) Goal difference; 4) Goals scored; 5) Head-to-head points.

Playoffs

Bracket

Wild card round

Quarterfinals

Semifinals

Bronze medal game

Finals 

Kärpät wins the series 4-2 and wins the championship.

Final rankings

See also
 2017–18 Mestis season

References

Liiga seasons
Liiga
Liiga